Fall Creek Township is one of thirteen townships in Henry County, Indiana, United States. As of the 2010 census, its population was 4,612 and it contained 1,953 housing units.

Fall Creek Township was organized in 1829. It was named for the stream which runs through it.

Geography
The streams of Candy Brook, Deer Creek, Fair Brook, Honey Creek, Mechanicsburg Drain, Mud Creek, Painter Run, Sharp Run, Sugar Creek and Sweet Brook run through this township forming Fall Creek which meets White River in Indianapolis.

Cities and towns
 Middletown

Unincorporated towns
 Honey Creek
 Mechanicsburg
(This list is based on USGS data and may include former settlements.)

Adjacent townships
 Salem Township, Delaware County (north)
 Jefferson Township (east)
 Harrison Township (south)
 Adams Township, Madison County (west)
 Union Township, Madison County (northwest)

Cemeteries
The township contains eight cemeteries: Fattic, Mechanicsburg, Miller, Keesling, Showalter, Pioneer, White Union, and Painter.

Major highways
  U.S. Route 36
  Indiana State Road 236

Education
Fall Creek Township residents may obtain a free library card from the Middletown Fall Creek Library in Middletown.

References
 
 United States Census Bureau cartographic boundary files

External links
 Indiana Township Association
 United Township Association of Indiana

Townships in Henry County, Indiana
Townships in Indiana